The Dalton Plan is an educational concept created by Helen Parkhurst. It is inspired by the intellectual ferment at the turn of the 20th century. Educational thinkers such as Maria Montessori and John Dewey influenced Parkhurst while she created the Dalton Plan. Their aim was to achieve a balance between a child's talent and the needs of the community.

Characteristics

Parkhurst's specific objectives were as follows:
 To tailor each student's program to his or her needs, interests and abilities. 
 To promote each student's independence and dependability. 
 To enhance the student's social skills. 
 To increase their sense of responsibility toward others.
Influenced at least in part by the teachings of Judo after conversations with the founder of Kodokan Judo, Dr Jigoro Kano.  Ref page 72 and 86 ISBN 978-1-56836-479-1

She developed a three-part plan that continues to be the structural foundation of a Dalton education:
 The House, a social community of students.
 The Assignment, a monthly goal which students contract to complete.
 The Laboratory, a subject-based classroom intended to be the center of the educational experience. The laboratory involves students from fourth grade through the end of secondary education.

Students move between subject "laboratories" (classrooms) and explore themes at their own pace.

Introduction in UK
In 1920, an article describing the working of the Dalton Plan in detail was published in the Times' Educational Supplement.  Parkhurst "has given to the secondary school the leisure and culture of the University student; she has uncongested the curriculum; she has abolished the teacher's nightly preparation of classes and the child's nightmare of homework.  At the same time the children under her regime cover automatically all the ground prescribed for examinations 'of matriculation standard,' and examination failures among them are nil."

The Dalton Plan is a method of education by which pupils work at their own pace, and receive individual help from the teacher when necessary. There is no formal class instruction.  Students draw up time-tables and are responsible for finishing the work on their syllabuses or assignments.  Students are also encouraged to help each other with their work. The underlying aim of the Dalton Plan is to achieve the highest mental, moral, physical and spiritual development of the pupil.

In the spring of 1921, English headmistress Rosa Bassett went to the Children's University School and stayed with Parkhurst. They spent hours talking about education. Parkhurst found Bassett in complete agreement with her ideas: "She was Dalton," Parkhurst wrote 50 years later. She described Bassett and Belle Rennie as the two people in England who were most enthusiastic and most helpful about the introduction of the Dalton Plan. Rosa Bassett was instrumental in the first application of the Dalton Plan of teaching within an English secondary school. She contributed a chapter to Parkhurst's book on the Plan,

Schools

List of schools

Australia
Ascham School, Sydney

Austria
Europaschule, Wien
HTBL Lastenstraße, Klagenfurt
Internationale Daltonschule mit IT-Schwerpunkt Wels
de La Tour Schule Deutschlandsberg

Belgium
Basisschool De Kleine Icarus, Gent
Basisschool De Lotus, Gent
Basisschool Dalton 1 Hasselt
Basisschool Dalton 2 Hasselt
Middelbare Dalton school VanVeldeke Hasselt
Het Leerlabo, kleuter-, lager en secundair daltononderwijs, Westerlo
Dalton Middenschool Lyceum, Gent

China
Shanghai East Century School, Shanghai
Little Dalton Kindergarten, Hong Kong
Dalton School Hong Kong, Hong Kong
Wenzhou Dalton Elementary School, Wenzhou

Czech Republic
ZŠ a MŠ Chalabalova, Brno
ZŠ a MŠ Husova, Brno
ZŠ a MŠ Křídlovick, Brno
ZŠ a MŠ Mutĕnická, Brno
ZŠ Rájec-Jestřebí
Gymnázium Slovanské námĕstí, Brno
ZŠ Benešova Třebíč
Základní škola, Brno
Základní škola Brno, Brno

Germany
 Angell Akademie, Freiburg
 Gymnasium Alsdorf, Alsdorf
 Grundschule Unstruttal, Ammern, near Mühlhausen
 Marie-Kahle-Gesamtschule Bonn, Bonn
 Albrecht-Dürer-Gymnasium Berlin, Berlin
 Theodor-Heuss-Gymnasium, Dinslaken
 Schillerschule, Erfurt
 Gymnasium Essen-Überruhr, Essen
 Internationale Gesamtschule Heidelberg, Heidelberg
 Gymnasium Lage, Lage
Gymnasium Vegesack, Bremen

India
Global School, Rahuri. MH

Japan
In Japan, Admiral Osami Nagano introduced a progressive educational method such as the Dalton plan to the Japanese Naval Academy School and influenced it.
Dalton Tokyo, Tokyo
Dalton Nagoya, Nagoya

Korea
Cheongna Dalton School, Cheongna

Netherlands
Basisschool de Bakelgeert, Boxmeer
Brederode Daltonschool, Santpoort Zuid
Casimirschool, Gouda
Dalton basisschool de Twijn, Utrecht
Dalton basisschool Rijnsweerd, Utrecht
Dalton Den Haag, The Hague (Den Haag)
Dalton mavo, Naaldwijk
Het Tangram, Rotterdam
Daltonexpertisecentrum, Instituut Theo Thijssen, Hogeschool, Utrecht
Daltonschool De Klipper, Berkel en Rodenrijs
Daltonschool Hengelo Zuid, Hengelo
Dalton Lyceum Barendrecht, Barendrecht
De Achtbaan, Amersfoort
De Klinker, Schiedam
De Poolster, Amsterdam
2de Daltonschool, Amsterdam
3de Daltonschool, Amsterdam
Erasmus College, Zoetermeer
Het Cheider, Amsterdam
Helen Parkhurst College, Almere
Hogeland College, Dalton vmbo, Warffum
Kardinaal Alfrinkschool (voor Daltononderwijs), Wageningen
Katholieke Daltonschool De Leeuwerik, Leiderdorp
Koningin Wilhelmina School Overveen
Markenhage, Breda
Maurick College. Vught
Saxion Hogeschool, Deventer
Schooladviescentrum, Utrecht
Stedelijk Daltoncollege, Zutphen
Stedelijk Dalton College, Alkmaar
Stedelijk Dalton Lyceum, Dordrecht
Spinoza Lyceum, Amsterdam
Spinoza 20first, Amsterdam
obs Theo Thijssen, Assen
obs Kloosterveen, Assen
Tweemaster-Kameleon, Oost-Souburg
De Vijfster, Capelle aan den IJssel
Wenke Dalton Consultancy, Meppel
Dalton Voorburg Lyceum, Voorburg
De Waterval, Ermelo
Jeanne d'Arc, 't Harde
De Juliana Daltonschool, Bussum
Wolfert Dalton, Rotterdam
Daltonschool De Margriet, Rotterdam
Wolfert Lyceum, Bergschenhoek
Daltonschool Klaverweide, Noordwijk
Daltonschool Maarssen, Maarssen
obs Het Klokhuis, Duiven
Ronerborg, Roden
KBS Eloy, Ugchelen
Chr. Daltonschool Koningin Emma, Zwolle
Haarlemmermeer lyceum Zuidrand, Hoofddorp
De Tweemaster, Hoorn
Basisschool De Ley, Leiden

Poland
 Academy International, Warsaw

Russia
Dalton School 1080, Moscow

United Kingdom
Bedales School, Hampshire
Bryanston School, Blandford, Dorset
Millington Primary School, Portadown
St Trinnean's School, Edinburgh (which inspired the fictional St Trinian's)
York Way Girls' School in King's Cross

United States
Dalton School, New York City

See also
Dalton International
J. G. Jeffreys, who introduced the Plan at Bryanston School, in England.

References

External links
Dalton School homepage

Alternative education
Education in the United States
Education in the Netherlands
Education in the Czech Republic
School types